As the peak organisation representing Professional Planners across the globe, the Commonwealth Association of Planners, abbreviated to CAP, has championed, promoted and connected planners and planning since its inception almost 50 years ago.

CAP is a volunteer based organisation, drawing support from our 27 member Institutes who in turn represent over 40,000 planners and allied professionals across the Commonwealth.

History 

The Commonwealth Association of Planners was formed provisionally on 23 September 1970, and its constitution ratified in March 1973, to, among other things;

"promote co-operation between member organisations and between individuals in the commonwealth, to achieve the most effective contribution by planners to the wellbeing of society, and the creation of a satisfactory environment."

In 2002 this was amended. The phrase "a satisfactory environment" was deleted and replaced by "more sustainable settlements and adequate shelter for all". This terminology derived from the Habitat Agenda that was agreed at the 1996 UN Habitat II meeting in Istanbul. It reflected the start of an increasingly close link between CAP and UN Habitat.

The association produces newsletters roughly three times a year, and holds conferences for planning theorists and practitioners.  CAP was led by Heriot-Watt professor Cliff Hague from 2000–2006, under whom the association played a significant role in developing "new urban planning" in response to the rapid urbanisation and increased slum settlements in cities across the globe. From 2006–10 he was Secretary-General of CAP. Since 2010 Clive Harridge has been Secretary-General. CAP works with the Commonwealth Association of Architects, the Commonwealth Engineering Council and the Commonowealth Association of Surveying and Land Economy: these act together as Built Environment Professions in the Commonwealth (BEPIC). CAP also works with other Commonwealth partners as ComHabitat. 

CAP led the case for the "re-invention" of planning at the 2006 UN Habitat World Urban Forum, where a book was launched to support this advocacy. The book. Making Planning Work: A Guide to Approaches and Skills was published by Earthscan. In 2010 CAP has produced two Discussion Papers published by the Commonwealth Secretariat. These are Gender in Planning and Urban Development and The State of the Cities: Why and How the Commonwealth must address the challenge of Sustainable Urbanisation.

Current President and Past-Presidents of CAP 
 2020 - Present: Eleanor Mohammed, Canada
 2014 - 2020: Dyan Currie, Australia
 2006 - 2014: Christine Platt, South Africa
 2000 - 2006: Cliff Hague, United Kingdom
 1996 - 2000: Bill Robertson, New Zealand
 1991 - 1996: Jacqueline daCosta, Jamaica
 1988 - 1991: Bill Robertson, New Zealand
 1984 - 1988: Dr. Peter Pun, British Hong Kong
 1980 - 1984: George Franklin, United Kingdom
 1976 - 1980: A. Ligale, Kenya
 1970 - 1976: Arthur Ling, United Kingdom

Member Organizations 

 Bangladesh Institute of Planners
 Barbados Town and Country Planning Society
 Belize Association of Planners
 Canadian Institute of Planners
 Cyprus Association of Town Planners 
 Ghana Institute of Town Planners
 Institute of Town Planners India
 Institute of Town Planners Sri Lanka
 Jamaican Institute of Planners
 Kenya Institute of Planners
 Malaysian Institute of Planners 
 Malawi Institute of Planners]
 Malta Chamber of Planners
 Namibia Council of Town and Regional Planners
 New Zealand Planning Institute
 Nigerian Institute of Town Planners

 Planner’s Association of Dominica
 Planning Institute of Australia
 Royal Town Planning Institute
 Singapore Institute of Planners
 South African Planning Institute
 St Lucia Institute of Land Use Planners
 Tanzania Institute of Planners 
 Town & Country Planning Brunei Darussalam
 Town Planning Association of Mauritius
 Trinidad & Tobago Society of Planners
 Uganda
 Zambia Institute of Planners

References 

C.Hague 2009 "Viewpoint: Planning in the Commonwealth" Town Planning Review 80(2) downloadable from www.commonwealth-planners.org/papers/hague.pdf

Professional planning institutes
Commonwealth Family